Álvaro Hugo Escalona Scaramelli (b. in Santiago, Chile, September 3, 1965), better known as Álvaro Scaramelli, is a Chilean singer, composer and therapist. He began his musical career in 1984 as the vocalist of the now defunct band Cinema. After the dissolution of the band in 1987, he continued his solo career. In 2000, he became the producer and manager of the Brazilian group Axé Bahia.  He also composed songs for the group including Beso en la Boca, which hit number 34 on the billboard Latin pop charts. He retired from the music industry in 2003 and now is in therapeutic medicine.

Discography

With Cinema 

 1985: Cinema en directo
 1986: Locos rayados

Solo 

 1987: Mi tiempo interior
 1988: Secretos develados
 1989: El espejo encantado
 1991: Ramo de flores
 1992: Scaramelli no Brasil
 1993: Álvaro Scaramelli
 1994: Cinema
 1997: Grandescaramelli
 1997: Anécdota del viejo whisky (live)
 1998: Canciones para la memoria
 1999: Tiempos buenos (live)
 2000: Greystoke
 2003: Scaramusas

References

External links 

 
 
 

20th-century Chilean male singers
People from Santiago
1948 births
Living people
Chilean people of Italian descent
20th-century Chilean male artists